Mountbatten Primary School was a primary school in Celle, Germany operated by the Service Children's Education for children of British military personnel based there.

History
Celle School was founded in September 1947 to cater to children aged 3 to 14 of personnel and staff from RAF Celle and nearby stations. A second school, Grenville School, opened in 1954 and Celle School changed its name to Collingwood School, named so in honour of Admiral Collingwood. Pupil numbers begin to decline after RAF Celle was closed in 1957 and the station returned to the German government. Collingwood and Grenville merged to form a single school in 1985 and renamed Mountbatten Primary School. The school was opened to a small number of English-speaking expatriate children, mostly from the Commonwealth and EU countries.

The school closed in summer 2012 as part of the British Army's closure of Celle Station under the Strategic Defence and Security Review by the MOD, which envisages the British Army withdrawing from Germany by 2020.

Curriculum
In its last years, Mountbatten Primary followed the National Curriculum and is inspected by Ofsted.

It was one of several feeder primary schools to Gloucester School in Hohne about half an hour away.

References

External links
School Website

Service Children's Education
Schools in Lower Saxony
Educational institutions disestablished in 2012
Educational institutions established in 1947
British international schools in Germany
1947 establishments in Germany